Thái Tông is the temple name used for several emperors of Vietnam. The term was derived from the Chinese equivalent Tàizōng.

It may refer to:
 Lý Thái Tông (1000–1054, reigned 1028–1054), emperor of the Lý dynasty
 Trần Thái Tông (1218–1277, reigned 1226–1258), emperor of the Trần dynasty
 Lê Thái Tông (1423–1442, reigned 1433–1442), emperor of the Lê dynasty
 Mạc Thái Tông (died 1540, reigned 1529–1540), emperor of the Mạc dynasty

See also 
 Taizong (disambiguation), Chinese equivalent
 Taejong (1367–1422), Korean equivalent

Temple name disambiguation pages